Nungessers is the name of the confluence of roads that meet at the Hudson and Bergen county line at North Bergen and Fairview in northeastern New Jersey. The area is the former site of the Nungesser's Gutenberg Racetrack, a late 19th-century gaming and gambling venue. The neighborhood just south of Nungesser's is called the Racetrack Section and the municipality of Guttenberg is nearby. A White Castle, an early drive-in fast-food chain, originally built in the 1930s has long been a landmark in the neighborhood, as has adjacent North Hudson Park.

Intersection
A major street that begins at Nungesser's is Bergenline Avenue which travelling south becomes the main shopping district of North Hudson. Just over the county line it becomes Anderson Avenue, travelling north through the urban eastern Bergen Hudson Palisades communities of Fairview, Cliffside Park and Fort Lee. The other roads which meet in the district are Kennedy Boulevard, Bergen Boulevard and Fairview Avenue from the west. To the east Boulevard East and Woodcliff Avenue connect to the northbound Palisade Avenue in the park.

Transportation
Nungessers is a major transit transfer point and terminus for public bus transportation. Several New Jersey Transit bus lines either originate/terminate or pass through the area, as do many privately operated jitney (dollar van) routes. Jitneys travel southbound to Boulevard East, Hudson County Courthouse, Newport Mall, 42nd Street (Manhattan), and northbound along Anderson Avenue to George Washington Bridge Plaza.

Service

References

External links
Unofficial New Jersey bus map
NJ Transit route finder
NJT Bus Routes in Bergen County
NJT Bus Routes in Hudson County

North Bergen, New Jersey
Neighborhoods in Hudson County, New Jersey
Streets in Hudson County, New Jersey
New Jersey streetcar lines
Bus transportation in New Jersey
NJ Transit Bus Operations
Transit hubs serving New Jersey
Transportation in Hudson County, New Jersey
Transportation in Bergen County, New Jersey
Fairview, Bergen County, New Jersey
North Hudson, New Jersey
Road junctions in the United States